Parg   is a village in Croatia. It is connected by the D32 highway.

Climate

Parg has a cool and wet humid continental climate (Dfb) due to its geographical position in the Gorski kotar region of Croatia, facing the Adriatic Sea. It's much cooler than either the coast or inland Croatia because of its elevation of 863 m above sea level.

References

Populated places in Primorje-Gorski Kotar County